Gordon Sinclair Thomson is a civic leader on the Australian external territory of Christmas Island. He served as President of the Shire of Christmas Island from 2003 to 2011 and is, at present, the Shire-President again, serving since 2013. He is a member of the Australian Labor Party and has also served as the General Secretary of the Union of Christmas Island Workers.

In a February 2020 interview with Guardian Australia, it was reported that Thomson had lived on Christmas Island for 22 years. He stated that the island was treated like a "colony", that it should be placed on the United Nations list of non-self-governing territories, and that residents should pursue free association with Australia as an alternative to the island's current status.

References

Living people
Year of birth missing (living people)
21st-century Australian politicians
Christmas Island
Mayors of places in Australia